Lepanthes johnsonii is a species of orchid found from Mexico (Chiapas) to Guatemala. It has a subspecies, L. johnsonii subsp. costaricensis.

References

External links

johnsonii
Orchids of Guatemala
Orchids of Chiapas